Ryan Nils Johansson (born 15 February 2001) is a professional footballer who plays as a midfielder for Spanish team Sevilla Atlético. Born in Luxembourg, he represents the Republic of Ireland in international football.

Club career
Johansson is a former youth academy player of his hometown club Racing-Union. He subsequently moved to Metz and joined Bayern Munich later. He was an unused substitute in Bayern Munich's 2–0 defeat against Borussia Dortmund in 2019 DFL-Supercup.

On 22 January 2020, Johansson joined Spanish club Sevilla on a contract until June 2026. On 13 August 2021, he joined Eredivisie club Fortuna Sittard on a season long loan deal. He made his professional debut for the club on 2 October 2021 in a 3–1 league defeat against NEC.

International career
Born in Luxembourg to a Swedish father and Irish mother, Johansson has represented all three countries at international level. In January 2019, Johansson announced that he intended to pledge his future to Ireland. In May 2021, he received clearance from FIFA to switch his allegiance from Luxembourg to Ireland.

Career statistics

Club

References

External links
 

2001 births
Living people
Sportspeople from Luxembourg City
Republic of Ireland association footballers
Republic of Ireland youth international footballers
Republic of Ireland under-21 international footballers
Luxembourgian footballers
Luxembourg youth international footballers
Luxembourg under-21 international footballers
Swedish footballers
Sweden youth international footballers
Association football midfielders
Segunda División B players
Eredivisie players
Sevilla Atlético players
Fortuna Sittard players
Republic of Ireland expatriate association footballers
Luxembourgian expatriate footballers
Swedish expatriate footballers
Expatriate footballers in Spain
Expatriate footballers in the Netherlands
Expatriate footballers in Germany
FC Bayern Munich footballers
Irish people of Swedish descent
Luxembourgian people of Irish descent
Luxembourgian people of Swedish descent
Swedish people of Irish descent